Rickson Gracie (born November 21, 1959) is a Brazilian 9th-degree red belt in Gracie Jiu-Jitsu and a retired mixed martial artist. He is a member of the Gracie family: the third oldest son of Hélio Gracie, brother to Rorion and Relson Gracie, and half-brother to Rolker, Royce, Robin and Royler Gracie. In the 1980s and 1990s, he was widely considered to be the best fighter of the Gracie clan, and one of the toughest in the world. In November 2014 he became an inductee of the Legends of MMA Hall of Fame, alongside Big John McCarthy, Pat Miletich, and Fedor Emelianenko. In July 2017, he was promoted to red belt, the highest ranking in Brazilian jiu-jitsu, but denied the rank as he had not yet met IBJJF time in rank requirements, keeping the belt for when he does.

Biography
Rickson Gracie, son of Helio Gracie, received his black belt in Brazilian jiu-jitsu at age 18.

Matches against Rei Zulu 
At 20, Gracie was pitted in a high-profile fight in Brasilia against famous Brazilian professional wrestler and fighter Casemiro "Rei Zulu" Nascimento Martins (father of Zuluzinho). Rei Zulu was not a qualified martial artist, having only a background in a supposedly indigenous wrestling style named tarracá, but he weighed 230 pounds (104 kg) and had experience in the vale tudo circuit, being supposedly 270–0 at the time. Despite his disadvantages, Gracie won the match at the third round by submitting Zulu with a rear naked choke, gaining immediate national recognition.

In 1984, Zulu requested a rematch in Rio de Janeiro, which became a controversial affair. According to Zulu, the Gracie family demanded the rules to be changed just one hour before the event, banning closed-fisted strikes, direct punches to the face, and kicks to a downed opponent. During the match, held in the Maracanazinho before an audience of 20,000 spectators, Zulu himself fouled by trying to eye-gouge Gracie, while Gracie himself gave Zulu a low blow later into the fight. Gracie also claimed Zulu was oiled up with vaseline in order to impede his grip. In any case, Rickson won again, submitting his opponent with another choke in the second round.

In November of the same year, Zulu defeated kickboxing champion Sérgio "Rock" Batarelli in another fight, which was the condition to host another match against Rickson, but it never happened.

Challenges to luta livre
In 1988, promoters tried to put together an anticipated fight between Rickson and luta livre exponent Marco Ruas. However, Hélio Gracie refused, demanding either that Rickson received a higher payment or that the bout happened inside the Gracie Academy, which were both rejected, so the fight didn't take place. Later, Rickson himself challenged Ruas to an impromptu match during a meeting with luta livre fighters in the Clube Boqueirão do Passeio. The reasons why this second fight fell off too are disputed: Rickson claimed Ruas asked for time to train, while Ruas claimed Hélio shut down the idea claiming Ruas was not a true luta livre representative. Other names like Eugenio Tadeu and Hugo Duarte were offered, but rejected.

Months later, Rickson was challenged by lutador Denilson Maia, but the latter's father died and he had to be replaced by Duarte. Although Duarte only wanted to fight in an event for a purse, Gracie encountered him on the beach, slapped him in front of his students and demanded him to fight there, so Hugo stepped down and faced Rickson on the sand. Gracie won after making him surrender to punches to the face. Shortly after, claiming that Gracie students had kicked him and thrown sand to his eyes during the fight, Duarte came to Rickson's gym and demanded a rematch. Gracie won again, causing a riot which forced neighbours to call the police.

Shortly after, Gracie challenged Tadeu, who had been entangled in a bout with his brother Royler when the police came. Royler and Tadeu fought to a 50-minute draw. The rivalry between Brazilian jiu-jitsu and luta livre continued without Rickson, as he left Brazil for the United States after the fight.

Vale Tudo Japan
In 1994, Rickson was contacted by Erik Paulson to compete in Satoru Sayama's event Vale Tudo Japan. Gracie traveled to Japan and participated in the tournament, firstly facing Daido-juku stylist Yoshinori Nishi. Gracie took him down and Nishi answered with a lockdown from half guard, but the Brazilian was able to pass his guard and catch him with a rear naked choke when Nishi turned his back. He later faced much larger wing chun practitioner Dave Levicki, but he was an even easier prey once taken down, and Rickson won by TKO after a flurry of punches. Gracie then fought American kickboxer Bud Smith at the finals, winning by the same method in even less time and getting the tournament's victory.

The same year, pro wrestler Yoji Anjo performed a dojo storm to challenge Rickson, after failed negotiations about Gracie wrestling for Union of Wrestling Force International. Gracie was the better in the fight and performed abundant ground and pound on Anjo, who did not surrender, so Gracie choked him unconscious.

A year later, Gracie was invited again to the next Vale Tudo Japan. In the first round he faced pro wrestler Yoshihisa Yamamoto from Fighting Network Rings, who unlike Rickson's previous opponents managed to keep him away from the mat by using the ropes and even tried a guillotine choke. However, Gracie eventually took him down and choked him. He squared against another pro wrestler in the form of Koichiro Kimura, swiftly defeating him, then met shoot wrestler Yuki Nakai at the finals. Nakai, who was almost blind from an earlier match against Gerard Gordeau, put up strong resistance to Rickson, but the Brazilian master managed to take his back and choke him for another tournament win.

Pride Events
In 1997, Gracie signed up to a fight against Yoji Anjo's superior Nobuhiko Takada in the Pride 1 event. Before the Tokyo Dome's 47,860 spectators, Rickson defeated the inexperienced Takada, mounting him and locking an armbar in 4:47.

Now enjoying a growing popularity in Japan, according to Gracie he was proposed to fight Mario Sperry at Pride 3, but the process was stopped due to Carlson Gracie's disavowal. Pride management also offered him to take Royce Gracie's place in his cancelled match with Mark Kerr, but he refused, citing one month to be a too short time to prepare. Fighting Network Rings's chairman Akira Maeda also challenged Gracie and proposed a fight as his own retirement match, but it was rejected. Rickson only agreed to sign up to a rematch against Takada at Pride 4, stating: "I feel Takada is a warrior and deserves the chance to try and redeem himself."

In their rematch, Takada had improved and was able to wrestle Rickson to neutralize his groundwork advantage, but the Brazilian master used a failed leglock attempt from the Japanese to sweep him and mount him. Nonetheless, Takada kept fighting under the jiu-jitsu master, dismounting him and threatening with a heel hook attempt, but Gracie, who was waiting until the end of the round to prevent Takada from capitalizing should he miss his opportunity, applied an armbar and submitted him again.

In May 2000, after Takada understudy Kazushi Sakuraba defeated Royler Gracie in the Pride 8 event, he took the mic and challenged Rickson, who was in the Gracie corner, but nothing came of it. Gracie preferred to face Pancrase's retired ace Masakatsu Funaki at Colosseum event. The event almost got cancelled, as Rickson demanded special rules which banned headbutts, elbow strikes, and strikes to the head both standing or on the ground, but an agreement was reached when the Pancrase management conceded to ban headbutts and elbows.

At the event, held at the Tokyo Dome and broadcast to 30 million TV Tokyo viewers, Gracie and Funaki started the fight clinching to the corner. Masakatsu appeared to have secured a guillotine choke, but the hold was loose and Rickson managed to go to the mat. They traded kicks to no effect, until some well timed upkicks from Gracie blew out Funaki's gravely injured knee. They clinched again, but the Japanese's injury rendered him unable to wrestle Rickson correctly, and he was taken down by the Brazilian grappler, who promptly mounted him. Masakatsu looked stunned while Rickson bloodied his face with ground and pound, and finally Gracie forced his way into a rear naked choke. During the post-match interview, Gracie claimed that one of the hammerfist delivered by Funaki made him lose his eyesight for a few moments.

After the Colosseum event, Gracie expressed interest in fighting judo medalist Naoya Ogawa, who was signed up for the next Colosseum event. He was also proposed by Pride management to fight Kazushi Sakuraba, who had already defeated Royce Gracie as well, but Gracie refused saying that Sakuraba "didn't have the spirit of a warrior". Rickson further said he didn't want to fight a wrestler who was so much smaller than him. Thus, New Japan Pro-Wrestling invited him to face Shinya Hashimoto, or  especially Manabu Nakanishi or Kazuyuki Fujita, but they were refused. The fight against Ogawa was set to the next year, with Naoya vacating his NWA World Heavyweight Championship to focus on training for the bout.

However, tragedy struck when Rickson's son Rockson was found dead in January 2001. Affected by the loss, Gracie contemplated retirement, and the event fell off after some negotiations. Months later, he stated he was willing to fight again and evaluating propositions, but nothing came from it. When the matchup with Sakuraba was brought up again, Rickson expressed uninterest on it, although he conceded, "...in my heart, I think Sakuraba deserves to get beat."

Other appearances
In August 2002, Rickson had a special appearance in Japanese media helping out Ogawa before his bout against Matt Ghaffari at the UFO Legend event, in which he assisted. After the event, Ogawa talked again about a fight against Rickson, which the Brazilian considered as possible return match. Rickson also mentioned Antônio Rodrigo Nogueira and Kazuyuki Fujita as candidates to fight him in said return. However, nothing of it came to fruition, even after UFO president Tatsuo Kawamura proposed creating an event in order to hold the match.

In 2003, Antonio Inoki offered Rickson USD$5 million for a fight against Fujita, but it had no answer.

After the match between Royler Gracie and Genki Sudo in 2004, the latter challenged Rickson. Producer Sadaharu Tanikawa tried to put together a bout between both, but he was unsuccessful. Three years later, after Kazushi Sakuraba defeated Masakatsu Funaki, Tanikawa also tried to promote a bout between Sakuraba and Rickson in 2008, with the same results.

Gracie has confirmed that he is officially retired now and his major focus is to give seminars on Brazilian jiu-jitsu and to try to develop BJJ as his father saw it: not a fighting tool but a social tool, to give confidence to women, children, and physically weak individuals by giving them the ability to defend themselves.

On July 21, 2014, Gracie appeared on episode #524 of The Joe Rogan Experience podcast hosted by Joe Rogan.

Films
Gracie was the subject of the 1995 documentary, Choke, by filmmaker Robert Goodman. The documentary followed Gracie and two other fighters (Todd Hays and Koichiro Kimura) as they prepared and fought in Tokyo's Vale Tudo Japan 1995. Released by Manga Entertainment, the film has been distributed to 23 countries. Rickson had a small role in The Incredible Hulk as Bruce Banner's martial arts instructor. His character is credited as an aikido instructor, despite his jiu-jitsu background. He has appeared on National Geographic's television programme Fight Science.

On May 8, 2020, news surfaced that a Netflix film about Rickson Gracie is in the making, release date targeted in late 2021. The film is directed by José Padilha and the role of Gracie is played by Cauã Reymond.

Controversy

Criticism of other fighters
Gracie raised the ire of some in the MMA community by criticizing the abilities of top fighters. In 1996, speaking about Ultimate Fighting Championship tournament winners, he labelled Don Frye and Mark Coleman as "very weak", and said that the latter "would offer no danger." He also saw Wallid Ismail as an "average fighter," Kazushi Sakuraba as "not a fighter that has a great expertise in anything" and "lucky all the time," and Marco Ruas as "nothing special" and "basic". Ruas, who was known for challenging Rickson to a fight several times in his career, was quoted in return as: "Talk is cheap. He has to step up in the ring and prove what he says."

Though he had not fought in a sanctioned MMA contest in eight years, Gracie claimed in 2008 that he could still beat the current top fighters easily. In an interview with Tokyo Sports, Gracie argued that Fedor Emelianenko was a great athlete, but possessed "so-so" technical ability, and that he (Gracie) was "100% sure" that he could defeat him. Two years after, Gracie stated that he disagreed with those who view Emelianenko as "somehow special" and that he believed Emelianenko deserved to lose the decision in his fight with Ricardo Arona; described Brock Lesnar as having "zero defense from the bottom" in the fight against Carwin; and criticized Shane Carwin for what he perceived were deficiencies in Carwin's jiu-jitsu game, characterizing him as "strong as a bull but flimsy like a paper tiger." Previous critical comments that Gracie made about Antônio Rodrigo Nogueira (claiming that Nogueira had "no guard") prompted Wanderlei Silva to say that Gracie is "living in a fantasy world" and launch a new challenge to him.

Fighting record
His father Hélio Gracie disputed Rickson's claim to have had over 400 fights. According to Hélio, Rickson has only competed in fights that are commonly known and reported: the two against Rei Zulu and those that took place in Japan. Helio Gracie alleged that Rickson uses practice and amateur bouts to obtain a number over 400, and that if he counted his fights like Rickson does, he would have in excess of one million.

Footage does exist of Rickson competing against his cousin Rigan Machado in a Jiu-Jitsu match in 1986, in what was one of the first public matches between members of the family. Alongside this, he was also seen competing in several Sambo competitions and submitting practitioners of the art on numerous occasions. However, these were not no holds barred or mixed martial arts fights, and as such would count towards one's records in Jiu-Jitsu and Sambo but not one's fighting record.

Rickson's only official loss in martial arts competition came at the 1993 U.S. Sambo Championships in Norman, Oklahoma. Rickson, claimed to be a former gold medalist at 1980 Pan American Sambo Championships at 74 kilograms, faced judo and sambo champion Ron Tripp. Tripp threw Gracie to the canvas by uchi mata in 47 seconds, thus giving Tripp absolute victory under FIAS International Sambo rules. Rickson disputed this loss, claiming he was misinformed of the rules of the event, despite claiming to be a two-time Pan American Sambo champion.

Personal life
Gracie has four children; Rockson Gracie (deceased), Kauan, Kaulin and Kron Gracie.
His son Rockson died of a drug overdose in December 2000;  Rickson was scheduled to fight Kazushi Sakuraba that year but the event was canceled  and Rickson never fought professionally again.

Mixed martial arts record

|-
| Win
|align=center| 11–0
| Masakatsu Funaki
| Technical Submission (rear-naked choke)
| C2K: Colosseum
| 
|align=center| 1
|align=center| 12:49
| Japan
|
|-
| Win
|align=center| 10–0
| Nobuhiko Takada
| Submission (armbar)
| Pride 4
| 
|align=center| 1
|align=center| 9:30
| Tokyo, Japan
|
|-
| Win
|align=center| 9–0
| Nobuhiko Takada
| Submission (armbar)
| Pride 1
| 
|align=center| 1
|align=center| 4:47
| Tokyo, Japan
|
|-
| Win
|align=center| 8–0
| Yuki Nakai
| Submission (rear-naked choke)
| rowspan=3|Vale Tudo Japan 1995
| rowspan=3|
|align=center| 1
|align=center| 6:22
| rowspan=3|Tokyo, Japan
|
|-
| Win
|align=center| 7–0
| Koichiro Kimura
| Submission (rear-naked choke)
|align=center| 1
|align=center| 2:07
|
|-
| Win
|align=center| 6–0
| Yoshihisa Yamamoto 
| Technical Submission (rear-naked choke)
|align=center| 3
|align=center| 3:49
|
|-
| Win
|align=center| 5–0
|  Bud Smith
| TKO (Submission to punches)
| rowspan=3|Vale Tudo Japan 1994
| rowspan=3|
|align=center| 1
|align=center| 0:39
| rowspan=3|Urayasu, Chiba, Japan
|
|-
| Win
|align=center| 4–0
|  Dave Levicki
| TKO (Submission to punches)
|align=center| 1
|align=center| 2:40
|
|-
| Win
|align=center| 3–0
|  Yoshinori Nishi
| Submission (rear-naked choke)
|align=center| 1
|align=center| 2:58
|
|-
| Win
|align=center| 2–0
| Rei Zulu
| Submission (rear-naked choke)
| Independent promotion
| 
|align=center| 1
|align=center| 9:00
| Rio de Janeiro, Brazil
|
|-
| Win
|align=center| 1–0
| Rei Zulu
| Submission (rear-naked choke)
| Independent promotion
| 
|align=center| 1
|align=center| 11:55
| Brasília, Brazil
|

Jiu-Jitsu record
KO PUNCHES
|- style="text-align:center; background:#f0f0f0;"
| style="border-style:none none solid solid; "|Result
| style="border-style:none none solid solid; "|Opponent
| style="border-style:none none solid solid; "|Method
| style="border-style:none none solid solid; "|Event
| style="border-style:none none solid solid; "|Date
| style="border-style:none none solid solid; "|Round
| style="border-style:none none solid solid; "|Time
| style="border-style:none none solid solid; "|Notes
|-
|Win|| Joe Moreira  || Submission (Choke) || V Copa Company - Absolute  || 1988|| || ||
|-
|Win|| Joe Moreira  || Submission (Choke) || V Copa Company - Light Heavyweight|| 1988|| || ||
|-
|Win|| Rigan Machado || Submission (Rear-Naked Choke) || Independent promotion|| 1986|| || ||
|-
|Win|| Murilo Sa || Submission (Armbar) || Copa Cantao|| 1986|| || ||
|-
|Win|| Rigan Machado || Submission (Exhaustion) || III Copa Company|| 1986|| || ||
|-
|Win|| Otavio Peixotinho || Submission (Armbar) || LINJJI || 1984|| || ||
|-
|Win|| Sergio Penha || Submission (Choke) || AABB || 1981|| || ||
|-
|Win|| Sergio Penha || Submission (Armbar) || AABB || 1981|| || ||
|-

See also
 List of Brazilian Jiu-Jitsu practitioners

References

External links
 

1958 births
Brazilian choreographers
Brazilian male judoka
Brazilian male mixed martial artists
Mixed martial artists utilizing Brazilian jiu-jitsu
Mixed martial artists utilizing judo
Living people
Middleweight mixed martial artists
Sportspeople from Rio de Janeiro (city)
Rickson
People awarded a red belt in Brazilian jiu-jitsu
Mixed martial artists utilizing vale tudo
Brazilian jiu-jitsu practitioners who have competed in MMA (men)